Pseudobrama simoni is a species of cyprinid fish endemic to China, and the only species in its genus. It is a pseudobream species living in fresh and brackish water in the Yangtze and other rivers in Eastern China.

References
 

Xenocyprinae
Cyprinid fish of Asia
Freshwater fish of China
Fish described in 1864